Artur Mayakovich Yusupov (born February 13, 1960) is a chess grandmaster and a chess writer. Born in Russia, he has lived in Germany since the early 1990s.

Chess career
Yusupov learned to play chess at the age of six and trained at the Young Pioneers' Palace in Moscow. He won the World Junior Championship in 1977, which then automatically qualified for the International Master title, qualification as a grandmaster following in 1980. Yusupov finished in second place at his first USSR Championship in 1979 (behind Efim Geller). International tournament results in the next decade included first place at Esbjerg 1980, first at Yerevan 1982, equal fourth at Linares 1983, first at the Tunis Interzonal 1985, equal first at Montpellier Candidates 1985, and third at Linares 1988. He also won the 1986 Canadian Open Chess Championship.

By this time Yusupov was also chasing World Championship qualification, reaching the semi-final of the Candidates Tournament on three occasions: in 1986 (defeated by Andrei Sokolov), 1989 (defeated by Anatoly Karpov) and 1992 (defeated by Jan Timman).

In the early 1990s, he returned to his Moscow apartment one day and came upon burglars. During the struggle that broke out, he was shot and considers himself lucky to have survived. Soon after, he decided to move to Germany, which has remained his home.

There were further successes in tournaments; first at Hamburg 1991, first at Amsterdam 1994 and second at Horgen 1994 (a category 18 tournament). It was around this time that he could be regarded as playing his strongest chess, as was reflected by his peak Elo rating of 2680, recorded in July 1995. He went on to share first place at the 2002 World Open and won at the Basel Rapid 2005 and at Altenkirchen 2005, making him the German Champion.

In 1999, Yusupov published a book on the Petroff Defence. He was at the time an acknowledged leading authority on the opening, and his book widely considered the most encyclopaedic and comprehensive treatment thus far. He has also been a noted expert on the Lasker Defence of the Queen's Gambit Declined, bringing many new ideas to an opening over one hundred years old.

"Purposefulness" and "strength of mind" are two of Yusupov's attributes, according to Alexei Suetin, who described him as "a player with a rational, positional style. He boasts high technical skill in the endgame and detailed knowledge of his customary opening systems. Least of all does he rely on inspiration; his every move is based on industrious study."

Throughout his playing career, Yusupov has been coached and mentored by Mark Dvoretsky, an International Master who was widely considered to be the world's leading chess trainer. Yusupov freely acknowledges that Dvoretsky's influence has been instrumental in many of his biggest victories. The strong alliance and collaboration that developed, led to them setting up the Dvoretsky–Yusupov Chess School. Students of the school have included strong grandmasters Peter Svidler, Sergei Movsesian and Vadim Zvjaginsev. In 2005, Yusupov was awarded the title of FIDE Senior Trainer.

Yusupov has also been a frequent contributor to Dvoretsky's books and has been a second and advisor to both Viswanathan Anand and Peter Leko during their world championship campaigns. He is a friend and training partner of the Russian GM, Sergey Dolmatov. Dolmatov was another protégé of Dvoretsky and like Yusupov, became a Junior World Champion (in 1978).

Notable games
Mark Taimanov vs. A. Yusupov, USSR 1982 English Symmetrical, Anti-Benoni, . Black structures his attack to undermine White's  and realise the full potential of his light-squared bishop.
Vassily Ivanchuk vs. Yusupov, 1991–93 Candidates Tournament, quarterfinals, game 9, Brussels 1991, King's Indian Defense: Fianchetto Variation. Classical Fianchetto (ECO E67), 0–1. In 1996, a jury of grandmasters and readers, voting in the Chess Informant, chose this game as the best game played in 1966–1996.

Books

 Artur Yusupov (2010) Boost your Chess 2 - Beyond the Basics. Quality Chess. .
 Artur Yusupov (2011) Boost your Chess 3 - Mastery. Quality Chess. .
 Artur Yusupov (2011) Chess Evolution 1. Quality Chess. .
 Artur Yusupov (2012) Chess Evolution 2. Quality Chess. .
 Artur Yusupov (2013) Chess Evolution 3. Quality Chess. .

Footnotes

References
Chess Magazine - Christmas 1985, pg. 258, Alexei Suetin article.

External links 
 
 
 1077 games by Yusupov available for download (PGN format)
 Build Up Your Chess book series: Build Up Your Chess 1, Build Up Your Chess 2, Build Up Your Chess 3, Boost your Chess 1

1960 births
Living people
Chess coaches
Chess grandmasters
Chess Olympiad competitors
German chess players
German chess writers
Russian chess players
Russian chess writers
Russian emigrants to Germany
Soviet chess players
Sportspeople from Moscow
World Junior Chess Champions
German male non-fiction writers